A Tale of Woe is the debut album from progressive death metal band Morna. The album was announced in early summer 2012 and released May 2013. The album was made entirely by Morna itself, including engineering and producing. Conception of the album is created quite unusual. It contains ten songs – three of them are re-master of older songs from earlier recordings, retrospective promo compilation called Succubus (2011) – and one of them, the last one, is an instrumental variation of ten-minute-long song in the middle of this conception. Hence, there are two hypothetical parts separated from one each other – first five songs, which have never been published before and three songs at the end of the album. Between these two parts there is one song which provides smooth overall impression of album story.

Artwork
The artwork of the album was created by Jakub Filip, the drummer. At first, it was simply drawn on paper and after that these complete sketches was digitized on computer by using graphic programs. It was made by Kristina Hulvakova, a girlfriend of guitarist Robert Ruman.

Track listing

Personnel

Morna
Robert Ruman – vocals, lead, rhythm and acoustic guitar, synthesizer
Michal Vlkovic – guitar
Tomas Cvecka – bass guitar
Jakub Filip – drums

Additional personnel
Peter Oriesek – acoustic guitar and additional guitar parts on "Unuhuinë"
Kristina Hulvakova – scream vocal on "Desperately Shining Urge"
Veronika Dzurkova – additional bass part on "Hands of Hidden Evil"

2013 debut albums
Morna (band) albums